Pioneer is a planned light rail station in the Los Angeles County Metro Rail system. It will be the southern terminus of the West Santa Ana Branch Transit Corridor project, located in Artesia at Pioneer Boulevard. Measure M funds are programmed for a scheduled completion in 2041, though the station may be constructed for an opening between 2033 and 2035. Further acceleration as part of the Twenty-eight by '28 initiative may cause the station to have operating service as early as 2028. The route may later on be further expanded along the West Santa Ana right-of-way, but Metro has not yet announced any plans to do so. 

The station is located adjacent to the former Pacific Electric West Santa Ana Branch Artesia station, built in 1906. Passenger services operated until 1950.

Connections
Metro route 62 passes nearby the station at 183rd / Pioneer. Norwalk Transit line 2 also passes by at the same stop. Norwalk Transit also provides buses which connect to the Norwalk/Santa Fe Springs Metrolink station.

References

Pacific Electric stations
Railway stations in Los Angeles County, California
History of Los Angeles County, California
Railway stations in the United States opened in 1906
Railway stations closed in 1950
Artesia, California
Future Los Angeles Metro Rail stations
1906 establishments in California
Railway stations scheduled to open in 2033